The Netherlands national under-18 baseball team is the national under-18 team representing the Netherlands in international baseball competitions. The organization is currently ranked 8th in the world by the World Baseball Softball Confederation.  They compete in the bi-annual U-18 Baseball World Cup.

See also
 Netherlands national baseball team
 Royal Netherlands Baseball and Softball Federation
 U-18 Baseball World Cup

References

National under-18
National under-18 baseball teams
Baseball